Ohio City is a village in Liberty Township, Van Wert County, Ohio, United States. The population was 705 at the 2010 census. It is included within the Van Wert, Ohio Micropolitan Statistical Area.

Geography
Ohio City is located at  (40.770878, -84.617274).

Demographics

2010 census
As of the census of 2010, there were 705 people, 287 households, and 198 families residing in the village. The racial makeup of the village was 97.4% White, 0.3% Native American, 0.1% Asian, 1.3% from other races, and 0.9% from two or more races. Hispanic or Latino of any race were 3.8% of the population.

There were 287 households, of which 31.0% had children under the age of 18 living with them, 57.1% were married couples living together, 7.7% had a female householder with no husband present, 4.2% had a male householder with no wife present, and 31.0% were non-families. 27.9% of all households were made up of individuals, and 13.5% had someone living alone who was 65 years of age or older. The average household size was 2.46 and the average family size was 3.01.

The median age in the village was 40.1 years. 24.4% of residents were under the age of 18; 7.1% were between the ages of 18 and 24; 26.1% were from 25 to 44; 28.7% were from 45 to 64; and 13.6% were 65 years of age or older. The gender makeup of the village was 48.9% male and 51.1% female.

2000 census
As of the census of 2000, there were 784 people, 312 households, and 218 families residing in the village. The population density was 1,706.0 people per square mile (658.1/km). There were 329 housing units at an average density of 715.9 per square mile (276.1/km). The racial makeup of the village was 97.32% White, 0.13% African American, 0.13% Asian, 1.15% from other races, and 1.28% from two or more races. Hispanic or Latino of any race were 1.91% of the population.

There were 312 households, out of which 36.2% had children under the age of 18 living with them, 57.7% were married couples living together, 9.0% had a female householder with no husband present, and 30.1% were non-families. 25.6% of all households were made up of individuals, and 12.2% had someone living alone who was 65 years of age or older. The average household size was 2.51 and the average family size was 3.00.

In the village, the population was spread out, with 26.7% under the age of 18, 11.4% from 18 to 24, 28.7% from 25 to 44, 20.7% from 45 to 64, and 12.6% who were 65 years of age or older. The median age was 36 years. For every 100 females there were 98.5 males. For every 100 females age 18 and over, there were 96.9 males.

The median income for a household in the village was $37,500, and the median income for a family was $42,734. Males had a median income of $29,526 versus $23,125 for females. The per capita income for the village was $16,304. About 1.7% of families and 3.6% of the population were below the poverty line, including 1.4% of those under age 18 and 1.2% of those age 65 or over.

History
The village was platted on March 4–8, 1876, by Butler, Patterson & Company as Van Wert Junction. On June 1, 1882, a vote was taken with 28 for and 11 against to change the name to Enterprise. The name Enterprise caused much confusion to the post office at the time because there was another Enterprise in Preble County. Again, the name was in need of being changed.

The town council met on June 1, 1890, and a man by the name of Lewis J. Kiggins brought up the subject, and asked the rest of the men if they liked Ohio City. The vote was taken and Ohio City became the new name.

In 1910, Ohio City was a very prosperous town. Being on the junction of several major railroads, its importance allowed it to sport three churches, one union school, two dry goods stores, two hardware stores, one clothing store, two millinery establishments, three hotels, three restaurants, one bakery, four saloons, two shoe shops, one tailor shop, one silversmith shop, one slack barrel factory, one lumber yard, two blacksmith shops, two elevators, one tile factory, one beet dump, two sawmills, one harness shop, one ice-making house, and three railroads all using the centrally located Union Depot.

John William Lambert of Ohio City made America's first gasoline powered automobile in 1891,  according to a five-year extensive study by L. Scott Bailey, a well-known automobile historian, editor, and publisher. The study found substantial evidence to enter this claim on Lambert's behalf. In 1891 Ohio City became the scene of the first automobile accident in the United States when Lambert's vehicle struck a tree stump in the road and bounced into a hitching rack.

Education
Ohio City has a public library, a branch of the Brumback Library.

Arts and culture
The annual "Lambert Days" festival is held on the third full weekend in July. This festival has activities such as a car show, a whiffle ball tournament, softball, a parade, and a Texas hold 'em tournament.

References

Bibliography
 Bailey, L. Scott, Historic Discovery: 1891 Lambert, New Claim for America's First Car, Antique Automobile magazine, Vol. 24, No. 5, October–November 1960
 Encyclopædia Britannica, Encyclopædia Britannica Inc., Chicago, 1968
 Scharchburg, Richard P., Carriages Without Horses: J. Frank Duryea and the Birth of the American Automobile Industry, SAE, 1993,

External links
 Village website

Villages in Van Wert County, Ohio
Villages in Ohio
Populated places established in 1876
1876 establishments in Ohio